Tetratheca erubescens is a species of flowering plant in the quandong family that is endemic to Australia.

Etymology
The specific epithet erubescens (‘blushing’) refers to the appearance of the flowers.

Description
The species grows as a low, tangled shrub to 50 cm in height and 1.5 m wide. The flowers are white, pink or mauve, with darker flecks and speckles.

Distribution and habitat
The range of the species lies within the Coolgardie IBRA bioregion of south-west Western Australia, where it is limited to the Koolyanobbing Range. The plants grow in rock crevices among hill crests, slopes and cliffs, on red-brown sandy and gravelly soils and ironstone.

References

erubescens
Eudicots of Western Australia
Oxalidales of Australia
Plants described in 2007